The Sailors Rendezvous (Fr: Au rendezvous des Terre-Neuvas, "The Meeting-place of the Newfoundlanders") is a detective novel by Belgian writer Georges Simenon, featuring his character Inspector Jules Maigret. Published in 1931, it is one of the earliest of Simenon's "Maigret" novels, and one of eleven he had published that year.

Plot summary
Whilst on holiday in Fecamp, Maigret answers a plea from an old friend to look into the case of a local boy, Pierre Le Clinche, who is accused of murder. Le Clinche, a radio operator on a deep sea trawler, is charged with killing the captain of the ship on its return from a fishing voyage to the Grand Banks of Newfoundland.

Maigret interviews the boy, and the crew who are ensconced  in the Grand Banks Café drinking their wages; he also talks to the Chief Engineer at his home in Yport. After finding a picture of a young woman in the captain's effects, he sees the same woman arguing with a man  at a bar. From all these he learns that the last voyage had been a disaster, “touched by the evil eye”. At the start of the voyage a man had been injured, and later the cabin boy had been lost overboard; The captain, Le Clinche and the chief had been at loggerheads with each other throughout the trip, the ship had spent nearly a month in an area with no fish, and when they did make a catch it had been improperly preserved and had rotted. None of those he spoke to were very co-operative, but more than that, they all had what Maigret called “the mark of rage” on them, something that they would not talk about, but affected their attitude to themselves and each other.

Maigret persists in his quest for the truth, reconstructing the events of the ill-starred voyage, until he is able to identify the killer.

Other titles
The book has been translated twice into English: In 1940, by Margaret Ludwig as The Sailor's Rendezvous (and reprinted as Maigret Answers a Plea in 1942) and again in 2014 by David Coward as The Grand Banks Cafe.

Adaptations
The story has been dramatized three times: in English in 1963, with Rupert Davies in the main role; in Dutch in 1967 (Jan Teulings) and in French in 1977 (Jean Richard).

Notes

References

Sources
 Georges Simenon The Grand Banks Cafe (1931, translated D. Coward 2014) Penguin Classics, London

External links

 Maigret at trussel.com

1931 Belgian novels
Belgian novels adapted into films
Maigret novels
Novels set in France
Novels set in the 20th century